The Palestinian key is the Palestinian symbol of their homes lost in the Nakba, when more than half of the population of Mandatory Palestine was either expelled or fled violence in the 1948 Palestinian exodus and subsequently refused the right to return. Almost 75 years later the key remains a potent symbol and reminder of physical and emotional loss and injustice.

It is considered part of a hope for return and a claim to the lost properties.

The keys are large and old-fashioned in style. Enlarged replicas are often found around Palestinian refugee camps, and used at pro-Palestinian demonstrations around the world as collective symbols.

Gallery

See also

 List of national symbols of Palestine

References

Palestinians
Political symbols
Palestinian culture
National symbols of the State of Palestine
History of the Palestinian refugees